is a Japanese manga series written and illustrated by Neko Nekobe which ran in Nakayoshi. A 54-episode anime television series aired on TV Asahi from January 12, 1991 through February 29, 1992. Each episode of the anime contained two 11-minute stories, often unconnected with each other. A short film was released in 1992. The anime was made into an anime comic format with six episodes per volume. The first volume was released on July 25, 1991.

After the end of the series, most of the anime's staff moved on to Sailor Moon (which would succeed this series in its timeslot), including director Junichi Sato and music composer Takanori Arisawa. Many references to Goldfish Warning! are made in Sailor Moon'''s first season.

A complete DVD set of the series was released on March 24, 2005.

Plot
A 14-year-old girl named Chitose Fujinomiya, a former very rich, currently an orphan who is kicked out of her super-elite school, Tokai no Gakuen (City's Academy in English language), while shunned by her former friends. She is sent to a rural public school, Inaka no Chugakkō, an alias is Inachū (Country's Jr. High School in English language), where very needy, and even pigs, oxen and chickens are students. 

The only possession Chitose has left is a pink goldfish named Gyopi, given to her by her beloved father, and very valuable. Her family's attorney attempts to steal Gyopi, but is foiled by Chitose's new schoolmates, namely Wapiko, a simple girl who can outrun almost anything and is well-liked in school. As it turns out, Chitose isn't poor; the attorney was merely hiding her inheritance for himself. Instead of going back to the super rich school, she buys the rural school and attempts to transform it into a refined school to compete with that of her rival/former best friend. However, the students of the rural school don't want to be refined.

Characters

Students

A very uptight girl with long blonde hair that is kept back with a hairband, she's worried that the students of Shin-Inaka no Chugakko (Wapiko especially) will cause her newly-formed school to be worse than Tokai no Gakuen. She is very arrogant to the point where she is unable to escape from a burning building due to her belief that she was raised as a high-class girl, and that she is not as tough as all the country students of Shin-Inaka no Chugakko, (who had all escaped from the building except Wapiko due to her trying to get Chitose to escape) as well as trying to frequently ban all normal customs of the school to enforce a more "proper" custom, such as a Tea Ceremony Club, but ultimately fails, due to her plans usually backfiring. She is the president of Shin-Inaka No Chugakko. Her nickname is "Chi-chan". 

An eccentric pink-haired girl who wearing Sailor-fuku. Perhaps best inhabits the description of "spunky", the agile Wapiko may be viewed as the closest thing the series offers to a true heroine. Almost always depicted in a comical chibi art style, she nearly always has a smile on her face and a happy-go-lucky personality, despite often being a chief instigator of events that bring anguish to Chitose. For being a middle school student, Wapiko tends to act and (for all appearances) think like a small child. Nevertheless, her super speed, bloodhound-like nose, winning spirit and bottomless appetite for fun have earned her the respect of the entire student body -- minus Chitose, of course. Despite Chitose owning Gyopi, she and the goldfish are quite close to each other.

Wapiko's classmate, the sub-president of Shin-Inaka no Chugakko, is puzzled over Chitose's recklessness. He is a doctor's son, is calm and friendly, but shows aggression toward the student council fees. He get good grades as studied in a clamorous classroom, once got all zero when Chitose's mother moved him to a quieter class. His nickname is "Shu-chan", but he's called "Shu-bo" by Aoi, and "Mr. Bluewhale" by Tamiko. 

Wapiko's classmate who is a blonde boy wearing sunglasses and a souvenir jacket, also the student body treasurer of Shin-Inaka no Chugakko. He is Wapiko and Shuichi's best friend from infancy, likes bargain-hunting at Inaka no Supermarket so much, often get out of school for it. A rare person that could make control Chitose and Wapiko perfectly, but it could lure him with food. (Yakisoba-pan especially) His nickname is "Aoi-chan". 

Shin-Inaka no Chugakko's student, A girl with ponytail who like Shuichi. 

Wapiko's classmate, One of chibi-characters. 

Wapiko's classmate.

Wapiko's classmate.

Wapiko's classmate.

Wapiko's classmate.

Chitose's rival, the student council's president of Tokai no Gakuen, is a very uptight, arrogant girl as Chitose. She wants obstacles to Chitose but almost failed, and is addicted to Aoi.

 
Chitose's ex-boyfriend, the sub-president of Tokai no Gakuen who hated poor people. Since he learned Chitose turns to rich again, wants to return her former love.

 
The chairperson of Tokai no Gakuen, the one of Chibi-characters. A relatively conscientious student than Yurika and Asaba, and is addicted to Wapiko. His nickname is "Takapi".

Staff

One of the chibi-characters, the principal of Shin-Inaka no Chugakko who has an unknown tentacle, is could talk with snail.

One of the chibi-characters. Wapiko's class teacher, who indignant at how his class is lawless. 

Shin-Inaka no Chugakko's music educator. 

One of the chibi-characters, a former Fujinomiya family's attorney, currently Yurika's handyman. He wants to swindle Chitose's property but always fails, and spends the whole time for Yurika's order.

Called herself as leave to Switzerland for healing, but constantly visited Shin-Inaka Chugakko with souvenirs from Shizuoka Prefecture or Nagoya area, and cause trouble.

Animals

A talking pink goldfish, which possession of Chitose's family, has worth several hundred million yen. Gyopi could even fly to the sky.

One of cats raised in Shin-Inaka no Chugakko.

One of the talking pigs raised in Shin-Inaka no Chugakko.

One of talking female cows raised in Shin-Inaka no Chugakko.

One of the talking male cows raised in Shin-Inaka no Chugakko, is a boyfriend of Ushiko.

One of the talking male cows, is a bad boy with a scar. He likes Yakisoba-pan.

One of the talking female cows, is a madonna of male cows and loves Shuichi.

Gyopi's best friend, a talking shark raised in Shin-Inaka no Chugakko's school pool. He only eats potato chips.

Gyopi's girlfriend which appears in the movie, is a talking yellow goldfish that sold for a hundred yen by Tanakayama.

 Theme songs 
Opening theme
 Wapiko Genki Yohou performed by Junko Uchida

Ending themes
 Super Kingyou performed by Junko Uchida
 Gyopi Dance performed by Junko Uchida

 Video games 
There were three Goldfish Warning! video games released in Japan. Two titles for the Game Boy, and another for the Super Famicom. Goldfish Warning! characters also appear in a few other games such as Panic in Nakayoshi World.Kingyo Chūihō! Wapiko no Waku Waku Stamp Rally!, Game Boy (1991), published by YutakaKingyo Chūihō! 2 Gyopichan o Sagase!, Game Boy (1992), developed by KIDKingyo Chūihō! Tobidase! Game Gakuen'', Super Famicom (1994), published by Jaleco

References

External links
 Toei Animation's official site
 
 
 Honobono's site including images, links and comparisons

1989 manga
1991 anime television series debuts
1991 video games
1992 anime films
1992 video games
1994 video games
Comedy anime and manga
Game Boy games
Game Boy-only games
Jaleco games
Japan-exclusive video games
KID games
Super Nintendo Entertainment System games
Super Nintendo Entertainment System-only games
Video games based on anime and manga
Video games developed in Japan
Yutaka games
Toei Animation television
TV Asahi original programming
Toei Animation films